West Drayton is a village and civil parish in the Bassetlaw district in the county of Nottinghamshire, England.

In 2011 the parish had a population of 225. The parish includes the villages of Rockley and Markham Moor.

West Drayton was originally known simply as Drayton, and was recorded under that name in the Domesday Book of 1086.  "West" was added to distinguish the place from the village of East Drayton, 4 miles east.

St Paul's Church dates back to the 12th century, but was rebuilt in 1874.  It is a Grade II* listed building.

References

External links 

West Drayton on GENUKI

Villages in Nottinghamshire
Civil parishes in Nottinghamshire
Bassetlaw District